The bottom eta meson or eta-b meson is a flavourless meson formed from a bottom quark and its antiparticle. It was first observed by the BaBar experiment at SLAC in 2008, and is the lightest particle containing a bottom and anti-bottom quark.

See also
 Eta and eta prime mesons, a similar particle with light quarks.
 Quarkonium, the general name for mesons formed from a quark and the corresponding antiquark.
 List of mesons

References
 
 

Mesons
Onia